Glenwood Plantation is a plantation located in Aroostook County, Maine, United States. At the 2020 census, the plantation had a total population of 5.

Geography 

Demographics

Politics

Federal politics 
Glenwood Plantation is located in Maine's 2nd congressional district. Due to its low population, Glenwood Plantation only cast 2 votes in the 2016 presidential election, both of which for Republican nominee and winner Donald Trump. In the House of Representatives elections, it cast both of its votes for incumbent Republican representative Bruce Poliquin. Both ballots voted against legalizing marijuana and requiring background checks to purchase guns. However, they also voted in favor of instituting a surcharge of 3% on Maine income taxes for those with an annual income greater than $200,000 in order to fund public education, and in favor of raising the minimum wage to $12 an hour. The ballots were split on the issue of ranked choice voting. All of these initiatives, except for Question 3 (background checks), eventually passed.

In the 2018 elections, the plantation did not cast any votes.

In the 2020 presidential election, the one ballot cast its sole vote for President Trump and incumbent Republican Susan Collins in the Senate election. Trump would go on to lose Maine as a whole but win the electoral vote from 2nd congressional district, while Collins went on to win the Senate election. In the House of Representatives elections, Republican Dale John Crafts, won the solitary vote from the plantation, though he lost the overall election to incumbent Democrat Jared Golden.

State politics 
In terms of statewide politics, Glenwood Plantation is in the 2nd Senate district of the Maine State Senate, currently represented by Republican,  Harold L. Stewart III. Glenwood Plantation cast its sole ballot for Stewart. In the Maine House of Representatives, it is located within the 144th district, currently represented by Republican Gregory Swallow, who also won the plantation's vote in 2020.

References

External links
Contact Information for Glenwood Plantation, Maine

Plantations in Aroostook County, Maine
Plantations in Maine